Computational irreducibility is one of the main ideas proposed by Stephen Wolfram in his 2002 book A New Kind of Science, although the concept goes back to studies from the 1980s.

The idea

 Many physical systems are complex enough that they cannot be effectively measured. Even simpler programs contain a great diversity of behavior. Therefore no model can predict using only initial conditions, exactly what will occur in a given physical system before an experiment is conducted. Because of this problem of undecidability in the formal language of computation, Wolfram terms this inability to "shortcut" a system (or "program"), or otherwise describe its behavior in a simple way, "computational irreducibility." The idea demonstrates that there are occurrences where theory's predictions are effectively not possible. Wolfram states several phenomena are normally computationally irreducible.

Computational irreducibility explains observed limitations of existing mainstream science. In cases of computational irreducibility, only observation and experiment can be used. Computational irreducibility may also provide a scientifically-based  free will.

Implications

 There is no easy theory for any behavior that seems complex.
 Complex behavior features can be captured with models that have simple underlying structures.
 An overall system's behavior based on simple structures can still exhibit behavior indescribable by reasonably "simple" laws.

Analysis

Navot Israeli and Nigel Goldenfeld found that some less complex systems behaved simply and predictably (thus, they allowed approximations). However, more complex systems were still computationally irreducible and unpredictable. It is unknown what conditions would allow complex phenomena to be described simply and predictably.

Compatibilism

Marius Krumm and Markus P Muller tie computational irreducibility to Compatibilism. They refine concepts via the intermediate requirement of a new concept called computational sourcehood that demands essentially full and almost-exact representation of features associated with problem or process represented, and a full no-shortcut computation.  The approach simplifies conceptualization of the issue via the No Shortcuts metaphor.  This may be analogized to the process of cooking, where all the ingredients in a recipe are required as well as following the 'cooking schedule' to obtain the desired end product. This parallels the issues of the profound distinctions between similarity and identity.

See also

 Chaos theory
 Gödel's Theorem
 Computation
 Principle of Computational Equivalence
 Artificial intelligence
 Robert Rosen
 Emergent behaviour

External links and references

 Weisstein, Eric W., et al., "Computational irreducibility". MathWorld—A Wolfram Web Resource.
 Wolfram, Stephen, "A New Kind of Science". Wolfram Media, Inc., May 14, 2002. 
 Wolfram, Stephen, "Computational irreducibility". A New Kind of Science.
 Wolfram, Stephen, "History of computational irreducibility". A New Kind of Science.
 Wolfram, Stephen, "History of computational irreducibility notes". A New Kind of Science.
 Wolfram, Stephen, "Undecidability and intractability in theoretical physics". Physical Review Letters, 1985.
 Israeli, Navot, and Nigel Goldenfeld, "On computational irreducibility and the predictability of complex physical systems". Physical Review Letters, 2004.
 "
 Berger, David, "Stephen Wolfram, A New Kind of Science". Serendip's Bookshelves.
 "Complexity is Elusive". Physical Review Letters, March 4, 2004.
 Tomasson, Gunnar, "Scientific Theory and Computational Irreducibility". A New Kind of Science: The NKS Forum.

References

Information theory
Theoretical computer science
Emergence